Yucatan is an unincorporated community in Yucatan Township, Houston County, Minnesota.

References

Unincorporated communities in Houston County, Minnesota
Unincorporated communities in Minnesota